Frisilia ancylosana is a moth in the family Lecithoceridae. It was described by Chun-Sheng Wu and Kyu-Tek Park in 1999. It is found in Sri Lanka.

The wingspan is 10–12 mm. The forewings are ochreous white with a discocellular spot. The hindwings are light grey.

Etymology
The species name is derived from Greek ancyclos (meaning hooked).

References

Moths described in 1999
Frisilia